Huntleya is a small orchid genus native to South America, Central America and Trinidad.

These are  epiphytic, pseudobulbless and often larger plants with subplicate leaves nearing forty centimeters long, erect and single-flowered. They occur in wet cloud forests at medium altitudes.

Species 
Species currently accepted as of June 2014:

 Huntleya apiculata (Rchb.f.) Rolfe - Colombia
 Huntleya brevis Schltr. - Colombia
 Huntleya burtii (Endres & Rchb.f.) Rolfe - from Colombia north to Guatemala
 Huntleya caroli P.Ortiz - Colombia
 Huntleya citrina Rolfe - Colombia, Ecuador
 Huntleya fasciata Fowlie - Ecuador, Panama, Belize 
 Huntleya grandiflora Lam. - Colombia
 Huntleya gustavii (Rchb.f.) Rolfe - Colombia, Ecuador
 Huntleya lucida (Rolfe) Rolfe - Venezuela (including the Venezuelan Islands of the Caribbean), Guyana, Ecuador, Brazil 
 Huntleya meleagris Lindl. - Trinidad and northern South America to Brazil 
 Huntleya sessiliflora Bateman ex Lindl. - Guyana
 Huntleya vargasii Dodson & D.E.Benn. - Peru
 Huntleya waldvogelii Jenny - Colombia
 Huntleya wallisii (Rchb.f.) Rolfe - Ecuador

References 

 Pupulin, Franco. Vanishing Beauty, Native Costa Rican Orchids vol 1 Acianthera - Kegeliella. Sistema Editorial y University of Costa Rica.

 
Zygopetalinae genera
Epiphytic orchids